Sir Robert Edmund Alford, KBE, CMG (10 September 1904 – 23 November 1979) was a British colonial administrator. He was Governor of St Helena from 1958 to 1962.

References 

 https://www.ukwhoswho.com/view/10.1093/ww/9780199540891.001.0001/ww-9780199540884-e-151670

1904 births
1979 deaths
Knights Commander of the Order of the British Empire
Companions of the Order of St Michael and St George